Ernst Eduard vom Rath (3 June 1909 – 9 November 1938) was a member of the German nobility, a Nazi Party member, and German Foreign Office diplomat. He is mainly remembered for his assassination in Paris in 1938 by a Polish Jewish teenager, Herschel Grynszpan, which provided a pretext for Kristallnacht, "The Night of Broken Glass".

Early life and career
Vom Rath was born in Frankfurt am Main to an aristocratic family, the son of a high-ranking public official, Gustav vom Rath. He attended a school in Breslau, and then studied law at Bonn, Munich and Königsberg, until 1932, when he joined the Nazi Party and became a career diplomat. In April 1933 he became a member of the SA, the party's paramilitary unit. In 1935, after a posting in Bucharest, he was posted to the German embassy in Paris. Regarding the "Jewish Question", Rath expressed regret that the German Jews had to suffer but argued that the anti-Semitic laws were "necessary" to allow the Volksgemeinschaft to flourish.

Assassination and motives

On the morning of 7 November 1938, Polish-German Jew Herschel Grynszpan, 17, went to the German embassy in Paris and asked to speak with an embassy official. After he had learned of the deportation of his parents from Germany to the Polish frontier, Grynszpan shot Ernst vom Rath, the third secretary of the German embassy in Paris. He shot the 29-year-old vom Rath five times, mortally wounding him with bullets to the spleen, stomach and pancreas.

Adolf Hitler himself sent his two best doctors, personal physician Karl Brandt and surgeon Georg Magnus, to Paris to try to save vom Rath's life. Hitler promoted vom Rath, who had been a junior officer at the embassy, to the rank of Legal Consul, First Class (Gesandtschaftsrat I. Klasse) hours before vom Rath's death on 9 November at 17:30 (5:30 p.m.). Kristallnacht was launched within hours.

Why Grynszpan, who had fled from Germany to France in 1936, chose vom Rath is not known with certainty, although he was upset over the news that his family was being deported from Germany back to Poland. As far as it can be established, Grynszpan and Rath did not know each other. Most accounts of the shooting state that Grynszpan did not ask for vom Rath by name but only asked to speak to a member of the diplomatic staff. The records were falsified in 1942, and the Germans spread propaganda that Grynszpan's intention was to kill the Nazi ambassador, Count Johannes von Welczeck.

Grynszpan, who was immediately arrested and confessed, insisted his motives were to avenge the Jewish people for the actions already taken by the Germans. He had a postcard on him written to his parents that read, "With God's help. My dear parents, I could not do otherwise, may God forgive me, the heart bleeds when I hear of your tragedy and that of the 12,000 Jews. I must protest so that the whole world hears my protest, and that I will do. Forgive me."

Aftermath
Vom Rath was given a state funeral on 17 November in Düsseldorf, with Hitler and Foreign Minister Joachim von Ribbentrop among those in attendance. Germany used the incident to publicize that the Jews had "fired the first shot" in a war on Germany; in his funeral oration, Ribbentrop declared, "We understand the challenge, and we accept it."

American journalist Dorothy Thompson reported widely on the case and raised funds for Grynszpan's defence in his French trial, which never took place. Much to the fury of Grynszpan who wanted to use the "Jewish avenger" defense successfully used by Sholem Schwarzbard at his trial in 1927, Grynszpan's French lawyer Vincent de Moro-Giafferi wanted to use as the defense the allegation that Rath was a homosexual who had seduced Grynszpan, and that Grynszpan had killed Rath as a part of a lover's quarrel. Under French law, those convicted of murder for political reasons faced the death penalty, but who committed a crime passionnel were usually given a lesser sentence.  

Grynszpan initially escaped from prison when France fell in 1940, but he was captured by the Nazis and taken back to Germany. He was sent to the Sachsenhausen concentration camp to face a trial there, one that Joseph Goebbels planned to turn into Nazi propaganda about an international Jewish conspiracy and to claim it as evidence that Jews had started World War II.

However, the allegations emerged that vom Rath was a homosexual, and Goebbels learned that Grynszpan was intending to use this claim in his defence at the trial by implying that vom Rath had seduced him. Grynszpan planned to claim that vom Rath was his pimp and he had been sent to be with various diplomats (although Grynszpan later stated this to be false in an encrypted letter sent from Sachsenhausen).

The homosexuality accusations threatened to humiliate the Nazis. Goebbels wrote that "Grynszpan has invented the insolent argument that he had a homosexual relationship with... vom Rath. That is, of course, a shameless lie; however, it is thought out very cleverly and would, if brought out in the course of a public trial, certainly become the main argument of enemy propaganda."

According to historian Hans-Jürgen Döscher, Germany's foremost authority on Kristallnacht, vom Rath was homosexual and had met Grynszpan in Le Boeuf sur le Toit, a popular haunt for gay men in 1938. The French writer André Gide, himself a homosexual, testified in his personal diaries that vom Rath was well known in the Parisian homosexual community. There were rumours that occasionally he was called "Madame Ambassador" and "Notre Dame de Paris." His brother, Gustav, was convicted of homosexual offences and there were allegations that vom Rath was treated for rectal gonorrhoea at the Berlin Institute of Radiology.

The trial was planned for 1942 but never took place, primarily because the Nazis (who also sent homosexuals to concentration camps) feared it would turn into a gay scandal.

Grynszpan's ultimate fate is unknown but he probably died in Sachsenhausen concentration camp. The last documentation indicating he was alive, or thought to be alive, was a Foreign Ministry memorandum on 7 December 1942. In 1960, at the request of his parents in Israel, the lower district court in Hanover officially declared Grynszpan deceased, listing his date of death as 8 May 1945.

See also
 Wilhelm Gustloff, Nazi killed in 1936 by David Frankfurter

References

Further reading
 Armin Fuhrer: Herschel. Das Attentat des Herschel Grynszpan am 7. November 1938 und der Beginn des Holocaust (Herschel. The assassination by Herschel Grynszpan on 7 November 1938 and the beginning of the Holocaust). Berlin Story Verlag, Berlin 2013, . In German.
 Sidney Smeets: De wanhoopsdaad (An Act of Desperation). Balans, Amsterdam, 2013. .

External links
 

1909 births
1938 deaths
Assassinated German diplomats
Assassinated Nazis
Deaths by firearm in France
German people murdered abroad
Kristallnacht
People from Frankfurt
People from Hesse-Nassau
People murdered in Paris
Sturmabteilung personnel
20th-century German diplomats
Nazi Party politicians
LGBT nobility
LGBT people in the Nazi Party
1938 murders in France
1930s murders in Paris